Yalboroo is a rural town and locality in the Mackay Region, Queensland, Australia.

Geography 
The highway and the North Coast railway line pass through from east to north-west on the same alignment. The town is centred on the former Yalboroo railway station, which is the location of a passing loop.

Cathu is a neighbourhood in the locality, north of the town.

A disconnected section of the Eungella National Park is in the south-east of the locality, while the west of the locality is within the Cathu State Forest which extends north into neighbouring Bloomsbury.

Yalboroo has the following mountains:

 Mount Beatrice 
 Mount Beatrice 
 Mount Catherine 
 Mount Seemore 
 Mount Zillah 
 Rhino Mountain 
 Rocky Mountain

History 
The town takes its name from the Yalboroo railway station, which was named by the Queensland Railways Department on 7 August 1920. It is an Aboriginal word meaning happy.

Yalboroo Siding Provisional School opened on 29 August 1927 and later that year became Yalboroo State School. It closed on 31 December 2000. The school was at 6885 Bruce Highway.

Yalbaroo Post Office opened on 1 December 1927, was renamed Yalboroo in April 1961, and closed on 28 February 1975.

Rise and Shine State School opened on 3 February 1936 and closed circa 1962. It was at 2 Watson and Boyds Road (corner Holds Road).

O'Connell River School opened on 6 August 1937 and closed in 1960. It was to the west of the intersection of Cathu O'Connell Road and Frys Road. 

Amenities 
The Mackay Regional Council operates a mobile library service on a fortnightly schedule at the Community Hall.

References

External links 
 Town map, 1961

Towns in Queensland
Mackay Region
Localities in Queensland